Giacomo Scalet (27 December 1909 – 2 May 1990) was an Italian cross-country skier. He competed in the men's 50 kilometre event at the 1936 Winter Olympics.

References

External links
 

1909 births
1990 deaths
Italian male cross-country skiers
Olympic cross-country skiers of Italy
Cross-country skiers at the 1936 Winter Olympics
Place of birth missing